Sognekraft is a power company that operates four hydroelectric power stations as well as the power grid in Balestrand, Leikanger, Sogndal and Vik in Norway. Annual average production is 436 GWh.

The company is owned by Bergenshalvøens Kommunale Kraftselskap (44.44%), Luster Energiverk (12.91%) as well as the municipalities of Vik (19.79%), Sogndal (10.98%), Luster (6.88%), Balestrand (2.50%) and Leikanger (2.50%).

Electric power companies of Norway
Companies based in Sogn og Fjordane
Energy companies established in 1947
Norwegian companies established in 1947